The Autorité de Régulation des Communications Électroniques et des Postes (better known by its acronyms: ARCEP or Arcep) may refer to several national agencies in charge, notably, of regulating telecommunications and postal services:
 the former official name (between 2005 and 2019) of today's Autorité de Régulation des Communications Électroniques, des Postes et de la Distribution de la Presse (ARCEP) in France;
 the current official name of the Autorité de Régulation des Communications Électroniques et des Postes (ARCEP) in Burkina Faso;
 the current official name of the Autorité de Régulation des Communications Électroniques et des Postes (ARCEP) in Gabon;
 the current official name of the Autorité de Régulation des Communications Électroniques et des Postes (ARCEP) in Togo;
 the current official name of the Autorité de Régulation des Communications Électroniques et de la Poste (ARCEP) in Benin;
 the current official name of the Autorité de Régulation des Communications Électroniques et de la Poste (ARCEP) in Chad;
 the current official name of the Autorité de Régulation des Communications Électroniques et de la Poste (ARCEP) in Niger.